Advent is a season observed in most Christian denominations as a time of expectant waiting and preparation for both the celebration of the Nativity of Christ at Christmas and the return of Christ at the Second Coming. Advent is the beginning of the liturgical year in Western Christianity. The name was adopted from Latin  "coming; arrival", translating Greek  from the New Testament, originally referring to the Second Coming.

The season of Advent in the Christian calendar anticipates the "coming of Christ" from three different perspectives: the physical nativity in Bethlehem, the reception of Christ in the heart of the believer, and the eschatological Second Coming.

Practices associated with Advent include Advent calendars, lighting an Advent wreath, praying an Advent daily devotional, erecting a Christmas tree or a Chrismon tree, lighting a Christingle, as well as other ways of preparing for Christmas, such as setting up Christmas decorations, a custom that is sometimes done liturgically through a hanging of the greens ceremony.

The analogue of Advent in Eastern Christianity is called the Nativity Fast, but it differs in meaning, length, and observances, and does not begin the liturgical church year as it does in the West. The Eastern Nativity Fast does not use the term parousia in its preparatory services.

Dates 

In the Western Rite of the Orthodox Church, and in the Anglican, Lutheran, Moravian, Presbyterian, and Methodist calendars, Advent commences on the fourth Sunday before Christmas (always falling between 27 November and 3 December), and ends on Christmas Eve on 24 December.

In the Roman Rite of the Catholic Church, Advent begins with First Vespers (Evening Prayer I) of the Sunday that falls on or closest to November 30 and it ends before First Vespers (Evening Prayer I) of Christmas. The first day of Advent also begins a new liturgical year. In the Ambrosian Rite and the Mozarabic Rite of the Catholic Church, Advent begins on the sixth Sunday before Christmas, the Sunday after St. Martin's Day.

Significance 
For Western Christians of the Catholic and Lutheran traditions, Advent signifies preparation for a threefold coming of Christ: firstly in the Incarnation at Bethlehem, then in a perpetual sacramental presence in the Eucharist, and thirdly at his Second Coming and final judgement.

History 

It is not known when the period of preparation for Christmas that is now called Advent began, though it was certainly in existence from about 480; the novelty introduced by the Council of Tours of 567 was to order monks to fast every day in the month of December until Christmas. According to J. Neil Alexander, it is "impossible to claim with confidence a credible explanation of the origin of Advent".

Associated with Advent as a time of penitence was a period of fasting, known also as St Martin's Lent or the Nativity Fast. According to Saint Gregory of Tours the celebration of Advent began in the fifth century when the Bishop Perpetuus directed that starting with the St. Martin's Day on 11 November until Christmas, one fasts three times per week; this is why Advent was sometimes also named "Lent of St. Martin". This practice remained limited to the diocese of Tours until the sixth century.

The Council of Macon held in 581 adopted the practice in Tours. Soon all France observed three days of fasting a week from the feast of Saint Martin until Christmas. The most devout worshipers in some countries exceeded the requirements adopted by the council, and fasted every day of Advent.

The first clear references in the Western Church to Advent occur in the Gelasian Sacramentary, which provides Advent Collects, Epistles, and Gospels for the five Sundays preceding Christmas and for the corresponding Wednesdays and Fridays. The homilies of Gregory the Great in the late sixth century showed four weeks to the liturgical season of Advent, but without the observance of a fast. Under Charlemagne in the ninth century, writings claim that the fast was still widely observed.

In the thirteenth century, the fast of Advent was not commonly practised although, according to Durand of Mende, fasting was still generally observed. As quoted in the bull of canonisation of St. Louis, the zeal with which he observed this fast was no longer a custom observed by Christians of great piety. It was then limited to the period from the feast of Saint Andrew until Christmas Day, since the solemnity of this apostle was more universal than that of St. Martin.

When Pope Urban V ascended the papal seat in 1362, he imposed abstinence on the papal court but there was no mention of fasting. It was then customary in Rome to observe five weeks of Advent before Christmas. The Ambrosian Rite has  six. The Greeks show no more real consistency. Advent was an optional fast that some begin on 15 November, while others begin on 6 December or only a few days before Christmas.

The liturgy of Advent remained unchanged until the Second Vatican Council introduced minor changes, differentiating the spirit of Lent from that of Advent, emphasising Advent as a season of hope for Christ's coming now as a promise of his Second Coming.

Traditions 

The theme of readings and teachings during Advent is often the preparation for the Second Coming and the Last Judgement. While the Sunday readings relate to the first coming of Jesus Christ as saviour as well as to his Second Coming as judge, traditions vary in the relative importance of penitence and expectation during the weeks in Advent.

Liturgical colour 

Since approximately the 13th century, the usual liturgical colour in Western Christianity for Advent has been violet; Pope Innocent III declared black to be the proper colour for Advent, though Durandus of Saint-Pourçain claims violet has preference over black. The violet or purple colour is often used for antependia, the vestments of the clergy, and often also the tabernacle.
On the third Sunday of Advent, Gaudete Sunday, rose may be used instead, referencing the rose used on Laetare Sunday, the fourth Sunday of Lent. A rose coloured candle in Western Christianity is referenced as a sign of joy (Gaudete) lit on the third Sunday of Advent.

While the traditional color for Advent is violet, there is a growing interest in and acceptance, by some Christian denominations of blue as an alternative liturgical colour for Advent, a custom traced to the usage of the Church of Sweden (Lutheran) and the Mozarabic Rite, which dates from the 8th century.

The Lutheran Book of Worship lists blue as the preferred colour for Advent while the Methodist Book of Worship and the Presbyterian Book of Common Worship identify purple or blue as appropriate for Advent. Proponents of this new liturgical trend argue that purple is traditionally associated with solemnity and somberness, which is fitting to the repentant character of Lent. There has been an increasing trend in Protestant churches to supplant purple with blue during Advent as it is a hopeful season of preparation that anticipates both Bethlehem and the consummation of history in the Second Coming of Jesus Christ.

This colour is often called "Sarum blue", referring to its purported use at Salisbury Cathedral. Many of the ornaments and ceremonial practices associated with the Sarum rite were revived in the Anglican Communion in the late 19th and early 20th centuries, as part of the Anglo-Catholic Oxford Movement in the Church of England. While Anglican liturgist Percy Dearmer does not object to the use of blue during Advent, he did not attribute its use to Sarum. "[T]he so-called Sarum uses are really one-half made up from the fancy of nineteenth-century ritualists." While the Sarum use was influential, different dioceses, including Salisbury, used a variety of colored vestments. "In the Sarum Rite the Advent colour was red, but it could very well have been the red-purple known as murray..."

The Roman Catholic Church retains the traditional violet. Blue is not generally used in Latin Catholicism, and where it does regionally, it has nothing to do with Advent specifically, but with veneration of the Blessed Virgin. However, on some occasions that are heavily associated with Advent, such as the Rorate Mass (but not on Sundays), white is used.

During the Nativity Fast, red is used by Eastern Christianity, although gold is an alternative colour.

Music 

Many churches hold special musical events, such as Nine Lessons and Carols and singing of Handel's Messiah oratorio. The Advent Prose, an antiphonal plainsong, may be sung. The "Late Advent Weekdays", mark the singing of the Great Advent 'O antiphons'. These are the daily antiphons for the Magnificat at Vespers, or Evening Prayer, in the Roman Catholic and Lutheran churches, and Evensong in Anglican churches, and mark the forthcoming birth of the Messiah. They form the basis for each verse of the popular Advent hymn, "O come, O come, Emmanuel". 

German songs for Advent include "Es kommt ein Schiff, geladen" from the 15th century and "O Heiland, reiß die Himmel auf", published in 1622. Johann Sebastian Bach composed several cantatas for Advent in Weimar, from Nun komm, der Heiden Heiland, BWV 61, to Herz und Mund und Tat und Leben, BWV 147a, but only one more in Leipzig where he worked for the longest time, because there Advent was a silent time which allowed cantata music only on the first of the four Sundays.

During Advent, the Gloria of the Mass is omitted, so that the return of the angels' song at Christmas has an effect of novelty. Mass compositions written especially for Lent, such as Michael Haydn's Missa tempore Quadragesimae, in D minor for choir and organ, have no Gloria and so are appropriate for use in Advent.

Fasting 

Bishop Perpetuus of Tours, who died in 490, ordered fasting three days a week from the day after Saint Martin's Day. In the 6th century, local councils enjoined fasting on all days except Saturdays and Sundays from Saint Martin's Day to Epiphany (the feast of baptism), a period of 56 days, but of 40 days fasting, like the fast of Lent. It was therefore called Quadragesima Sancti Martini (Saint Martin's Lent). This period of fasting was later shortened and called "Advent" by the Church.

In the Anglican and Lutheran churches this fasting rule was later relaxed. The Roman Catholic Church later abolished the precept of fasting (at an unknown date at the latest in 1917), later, but kept Advent as a season of penitence. In addition to fasting, dancing and similar festivities were forbidden in these traditions. On Rose Sunday, relaxation of the fast was permitted. Eastern Orthodox and Oriental Orthodox churches still hold the tradition of fasting for 40 days before Christmas.

Local rites 

In England, especially in the northern counties, there was a custom (now extinct) for poor women to carry around the "Advent images", two dolls dressed to represent Jesus and the Blessed Virgin Mary. A halfpenny coin was expected from every one to whom these were exhibited and bad luck was thought to menace the household not visited by the doll-bearers before Christmas Eve at the latest.

In Normandy, farmers employed children under twelve to run through the fields and orchards armed with torches, setting fire to bundles of straw, and thus it was believed driving out such vermin as were likely to damage the crops.

In Italy, among other Advent celebrations is the entry into Rome in the last days of Advent of the Calabrian pifferari, or bagpipe players, who play before the shrines of Mary, the mother of Jesus: in Italian tradition, the shepherds played these pipes when they came to the manger at Bethlehem to pay homage to the infant Jesus.

In recent times the most common observance of Advent outside church circles has been the keeping of an advent calendar or advent candle, with one door being opened in the calendar, or one section of the candle being burned, on each day in December leading up to Christmas Eve. In many countries, the first day of Advent often heralds the start of the Christmas season, with many people opting to erect their Christmas trees and Christmas decorations on or immediately before Advent Sunday.

Since 2011, an Advent labyrinth consisting of 2500 tealights has been formed for the third Saturday of Advent in Frankfurt-Bornheim.

Advent wreath 

The keeping of an Advent wreath is a common practice in homes or churches. The concept of the Advent wreath originated among German Lutherans in the 16th century. However, it was not until three centuries later that the modern Advent wreath took shape. The modern Advent wreath, with its candles representing the Sundays of Advent, originated from an 1839 initiative by Johann Hinrich Wichern, a Protestant pastor in Germany and a pioneer in urban mission work among the poor.

In view of the impatience of the children he taught as they awaited Christmas, he made a ring of wood, with nineteen small red tapers and four large white candles. Every morning a small candle was lit, and every Sunday a large candle. Custom has retained only the large candles.

The wreath crown is traditionally made of fir tree branches knotted with a red ribbon and decorated with pine cones, holly, laurel, and sometimes mistletoe. It is also an ancient symbol signifying several things; first of all, the crown symbolises victory, in addition to its round form evoking the sun and its return each year. The number four represents the four Sundays of Advent, and the green twigs are a sign of life and hope. 

The fir tree is a symbol of strength and laurel a symbol of victory over sin and suffering. The latter two, with the holly, do not lose their leaves, and thus represent the eternity of God. The flames of candles are the representation of the Christmas light approaching and bringing hope and peace, as well as the symbol of the struggle against darkness. For Christians, this crown is also the symbol of Christ the King, the holly recalling the crown of thorns resting on the head of Christ.

The Advent wreath is adorned with candles, usually three violet or purple and one pink, the pink candle being lit on the Third Sunday of Advent, called Gaudete Sunday after the opening word, Gaudete, meaning "Rejoice", of the entrance antiphon at Mass. Some add a fifth candle (white), known as the Christ Candle, in the middle of the wreath, to be lit on Christmas Eve or Day.

The candles symbolise, in one interpretation, the great stages of salvation before the coming of the Messiah; the first is the symbol of the forgiveness granted to Adam and Eve, the second is the symbol of the faith of Abraham and of the patriarchs who believe in the gift of the Promised Land, the third is the symbol of the joy of David whose lineage does not stop and also testifies to his covenant with God, and the fourth and last candle is the symbol of the teaching of the prophets who announce a reign of justice and peace. Or they symbolise the four stages of human history; creation, the Incarnation, the redemption of sins, and the Last Judgment.

In Orthodox churches there are sometimes wreaths with six candles, in line with the six-week duration of the Nativity Fast/Advent.

In Sweden, white candles, symbol of festivity and purity, are used in celebrating Saint Lucy's Day, 13 December, which always falls within Advent.

Four Sundays 

In the Roman Rite of the Catholic Church, the readings of Mass on the Sundays of Advent have distinct themes:
 On the First Sunday (Advent Sunday), they look forward to the Second Coming of Christ.
 On the Second Sunday, the Gospel reading recalls the preaching of John the Baptist, who came to "prepare the way of the Lord"; the other readings have associated themes.
 On the Third Sunday (Gaudete Sunday), the Gospel reading is again about John the Baptist, the other readings about the joy associated with the coming of the Saviour.
 On the Fourth Sunday, the Gospel reading is about the events involving Mary and Joseph that led directly to the birth of Jesus, while the other readings are related to these.

In another tradition:
 The readings for the first Sunday in Advent relate to the Old Testament patriarchs who were Christ's ancestors, so some call the first Advent candle that of hope.
 The readings for the second Sunday concern Christ's birth in a manger and other prophecies, so the candle may be called that of Bethlehem, the way, or of the prophets.
 The third Sunday, Gaudete Sunday after the first word of the introit (Philippians 4:4), is celebrated with rose-coloured vestments similar to Laetare Sunday at the middle point of Lent. The readings relate to John the Baptist, and the rose candle may be called that of joy or of the shepherds. In the Episcopal Church USA, the collect "Stir up" (the first words of the collect) may be read during this week, although before the 1979 revision of the Book of Common Prayer it was sometimes read in the first Sunday of Advent. Even earlier, 'Stir-up Sunday' was once jocularly associated with the stirring of the Christmas mincemeat, begun before Advent. The phrase "stir up" occurs at the start of the collect for the last Sunday before Advent in the 1662 Book of Common Prayer.
 The readings for the fourth Sunday relate to the annunciation of Christ's birth, so the candle may be known as the Angel's candle. The Magnificat or Song of Mary may be featured.
 Where an Advent wreath includes a fifth candle, it is known as the Christ candle and is lit during the Christmas Eve service.

Other variations of the themes celebrated on each of the four Sundays include:
 The Prophets' Candle, symbolizing hope; the Bethlehem Candle, symbolizing faith; the Shepherds' Candle, symbolizing joy; the Angel's Candle, symbolizing peace
 Hope–Love–Joy–Peace
 Hope–Peace–Joy–Love
 Faithfulness–Hope–Joy–Love
 Prophets–Angels–Shepherds–Magi
 Faith–Prepare–Joy–Love

See also 

 Christmas market
 Dormition Fast
 Ember days
 Fasting and abstinence in the Roman Catholic Church
 Four last things
 Great Lent
 Mortification of the flesh in Christianity
 Nativity Fast

References

External links 

 Daily Advent Devotional (LHM)
 The Season of Advent (Christian Resource Institute)
 Advent Sermon Series from the Society of Saint John the Evangelist, a monastic community in the Episcopal Church
 American Catholic: Advent to Epiphany Prayers, calendar and activities
 Liturgical Resources for Advent
 Advent FAQ at the Lutheran Church–Missouri Synod web site 
 Advent Online Devotional site
 Online Resources for the Season of Advent at The Text This Week
 Artcyclopedia Advent Calendar 2004

Further reading 
 Book of Common Prayer, 1979 according to the usage of The Episcopal Church

 
480s establishments
5th-century Christianity
Christian fasting
November observances
December observances
Nativity of Jesus in worship and liturgy